Jiang Yiyi (born 1 January 2001) is a Chinese actress.

Career
Jiang is a child actress who is known for portraying the younger counterparts of many notable characters in television and films.
She made her first acting appearance in the 2007 drama Beautiful Life, 
and first became known for her role as young Nie Shen'er in the historical romance drama Beauty's Rival in Palace  (2010). Some of her well-known appearances include wuxia drama Swordsman as young Ren Yingying, historical drama Prince of Lan Ling as young Yang Xuewu, and wuxia romance drama The Romance of the Condor Heroes as young Guo Fu.

In 2015, Jiang played a Korean transfer taekwondo student in the hit youth sports drama The Whirlwind Girl and its sequel, Tornado Girl. The same year, she starred in historical drama Legend of Ban Shu as one of the students.

In 2017, Jiang played her first lead role in the science fiction suspense drama Die Now.

In 2018, Jiang co-starred in the period adventure drama Eagles and Youngsters.

In 2020, Jiang gained attention for her guest appearance in the xianxia romance drama Love of Thousand Years. The same year, she played the leading role of Nezha in the shenmo drama Heroic Journey of Nezha.

Filmography

Film

Television series

Discography

References

2001 births
21st-century Chinese actresses
Living people
Chinese television actresses
Chinese film actresses
Actresses from Beijing
Chinese child actresses